Gregorio Marañón is a station on Line 7 and Line 10 of the Madrid Metro. It is located in fare Zone A.

References 

Line 7 (Madrid Metro) stations
Line 10 (Madrid Metro) stations
Railway stations in Spain opened in 1998
Buildings and structures in Almagro neighborhood, Madrid
Buildings and structures in Ríos Rosas neighborhood, Madrid